The Adventuress from the Floor Above (Italian: L'avventuriera del piano di sopra) is a 1941 Italian "white-telephones" comedy film directed by Raffaello Matarazzo and starring Vittorio De Sica, Clara Calamai and Giuditta Rissone. It was made at the Palatino Studios in Rome. The film was part of the popular White Telephone genre of comedies.

Synopsis
When his wife goes away to attend her sister's wedding, the young lawyer Fabrizio Marchini expects a quiet time at home. However that evening, a woman bursts into his apartment and demands refuge, claiming that her angry husband Signor Rossi is searching for her. He shelters her when the abrasive Rossi, who rents the apartment above, enters and demands to search the place. Once he is gone, she spends the night in his bed while he sleeps on the sofa. In the morning, however he discovers that both she and his wife's valuable pearl necklace have disappeared. With the assistance of a friend he attempts to track her down before his wife returns.

Cast
 Vittorio De Sica as Fabrizio Marchini  
 Clara Calamai as Biancamaria Rossi 
 Giuditta Rissone as Clara Marchini  
 Olga Vittoria Gentilli as La madre di biancamaria  
 Camillo Pilotto as Rossi  
 Carlo Campanini as Arturo  
 Ernesto Almirante as Il padre de Biancamaria 
 Giselda Gasperini as Lucrezia - la cameriera di Arturo  
 Jucci Kellerman as La cameriera 
 Dina Romano as Matilde

References

Bibliography 
 Moliterno, Gino. Historical Dictionary of Italian Cinema. Scarecrow Press, 2008.

External links 

1941 films
Italian comedy films
1941 comedy films
1940s Italian-language films
Films directed by Raffaello Matarazzo
Italian black-and-white films
Films shot at Palatino Studios
1940s Italian films